GEM (acronym for "Girls Entertainment Mixture") was a Japanese idol girl group formed in 2013, and part of the Idol Street project maintained by Avex Trax. GEM disbanded on March 25, 2018 and the remaining members will be transferred to other iDOL Street group.

Members
Yuki Kanazawa
Chisami Ito
Yu Morioka
Nana Minamiguchi
Jurin Kumashiro
Kako Oguri
Maaya Takeda
Sara Hirano
Hirari Nishida

Former members

 Nagi Ozeki
 Hazuki Sakamoto
 Nana Asakawa
 Risa Uchimura
 Monami Noguchi
 Lana Murakami
 Maho Iyama

Timeline 

Black - hiatus

Discography

Singles

Music Cards

Albums

Collaborations

References

External links
GEM Official Website 
GEM Official Website (Avex network) 

Japanese girl groups
Japanese idol groups
Musical groups established in 2012
2012 establishments in Japan
Musical groups disestablished in 2018